This is an index of color topic-related articles.

 Achromatic color
 Additive color
 Afterimage
 Analogous colors
 Bayer filter
 Blue–green distinction in language
 Chromaticity
 Chrominance
 Chromolithograph
 Chromophobia
 Chromotherapy
 Color (← Colour, Color (disambiguation))
 Black
 Shades of black
 Blue
Shades of blue
 Green
Shades of green
 Red
Shades of red
 Silver (color)
 White
Shades of white
 Yellow
Shades of yellow
 Color analysis
 Color balance
 Color blindness
 Color chart
 Color code
 Color constancy
 Color depth
 Colorfulness
 Color gradient
 Color in Chinese culture
 Color management
 Color mapping
 Color model
 Color mixing
 Color photography
 Color picker
 Color preferences
 Color printing
 Color psychology
 Color realism
 Color recovery
 Color rendering index
 Color scheme
 Color solid
 Color space
 CMYK color space
 HSV color space
 HSL color space
 RGB color spaces
 Adobe RGB color space
 SRGB color space
 YIQ
 YUV
 Color space encoding
 ColorSync
 Color symbolism
 Color temperature
 Color term
 Color theory
 Color triangle
 Color vision
 Color wheel
 Colorimeter
 Colorimetry
 Color of chemicals
 Colour banding
 Colour cast
 Complementary color
 Cool colors
 False color
 Film colorization
 Four-color printing
 Cyan, magenta, yellow
 Horses
Equine coat color (wikilinks to all other coat color articles)
Color breed
 Grayscale
 Hue
 Human skin color
 Impossible color
 Kruithof curve
 Lightness
 Light-on-dark color scheme
 Liturgical colours
 Local color
 Lüscher color test
 Metamerism
 Monochromatic color
 Multi-primary color display
 National colours
 Palette (computing)
 List of color palettes
 Pastel (color)
 Political colour
 Primary color
 Rainbow
 Secondary color
 Saturation
 Spectral color
 Spot color
 Structural coloration
 Subtractive color
 Tertiary color
 Theory of Colours
 Thermochromics
 Tincture (heraldry)
 argent, azure, gules, or, purpure, sable, vert
 Tint, shade and tone
 Traditional colors of Japan
 Visual perception
 Visible spectrum
 Warm colors
 Watercolor
 Web colors
 X11 color names

Lists

 List of colors: A–F
 List of colors: G–M
 List of colors: N–Z
 List of colors (compact)
 List of colors by shade
 List of color palettes
 List of color spaces
 List of Crayola crayon colors
 history
 List of international auto racing colours
 List of RAL colors
 List of U.S. state colors

See also

01
Color topics
Color topics
Color topics
Color